Aleksandr Dmitriyevich Kalinin (born 1 January 1975) is a Russian football coach and a former player.

References

1975 births
Footballers from Yaroslavl
Living people
Russian footballers
FC Shinnik Yaroslavl players
Russian Premier League players
FC Spartak Kostroma players
FC Khimik-Arsenal players
Russian football managers
Association football defenders
FC Dynamo Vologda players